Corybas barbarae, commonly known as fairy lanterns, is a species of terrestrial orchid endemic to eastern Australia including Lord Howe Island. It has a single dark green or reddish green, heart-shaped leaf and a small sparkling white or pinkish flower with an inflated dorsal sepal obscuring its hairy labellum.

Description 
The leaf is dark green or reddish green on the upper surface and silvery green to light reddish purple on the lower side. Flowering occurs from March to July.

Taxonomy 
Corybas barbarae was first formally described in 1988 by David Jones from a specimen collected on Tamborine Mountain and the description was published in Austrobaileya. The specific epithet (barbarae) honours Barbara Elizabeth Jones, the wife of the author.

Distribution and habitat
Fairy lanterns is widespread and common, growing in protected areas in forest and woodland from the Atherton Tableland in Queensland to the northern suburbs of Sydney in New South Wales. It also occurs on Lord Howe Island.

References 

barbarae
Endemic orchids of Australia
Orchids of New South Wales
Orchids of Queensland
Plants described in 1988